Bei River (北江; literally "The North River"; pinyin: Běi Jiāng; wade-giles: Pei3 Chiang1; jyutping: Bak1 Gong1, literally "North River") is the northern tributary of the Pearl River in southern China. The other two main tributaries of the Pearl River are the Xi Jiang and the Dong Jiang.

See also
 Pearl River Delta
 Geography of China
 List of rivers of Asia

References

Rivers of Guangdong
Tributaries of the Pearl River (China)